The Dean of Carlisle is based in Carlisle, UK and is the head of the Chapter of Carlisle Cathedral. There have been 39 previous incumbents and the post is currently vacant.

List of deans

Early modern
1542–1547 Lancelot Salkeld (last prior)
1548–1554 Thomas Smith
1554–1560 Lancelot Salkeld (again)
1560–1577 Thomas Smith (again)
1577–1596 John Wolley
1596–1622 Christopher Perkins
1622–1626 Francis White
1626–1629 William Peterson (afterwards Dean of Exeter)
1629–1654 Thomas Comber
1660–1672 Guy Carleton
1672–1684 Thomas Smith
1684–1686 Thomas Musgrave
1686–1704 William Grahme (afterwards Dean of Wells)
1704–1711 Francis Atterbury
1711–1713 George Smalridge
1713–1716 Thomas Gibson
1716–1727 Thomas Tullie
1727–1735 George Fleming
1734–1763 Robert Bolton
1764 Charles Tarrant (afterwards Dean of Peterborough, 1764–1791)
1764–1778 Thomas Wilson
1778–1782 Thomas Percy
1782–1791 Jeffery Ekins

Late modern
1792–1820 Isaac Milner
1820–1844 Robert Hodgson
1844–1848 John Cramer
1848 Samuel Hinds
1849–1856 Archibald Campbell Tait
1856–1881 Francis Close
1882–1884 John Oakley
1884–1905 William Henderson
1906–1908 Charles Ridgeway
1908–1917 William Barker
1917–1924 Hastings Rashdall
1924–1933 Henry Stuart
1933–1938 Cecil Cooper
1938–1942 Frederick Matheson
1943–1959 Cyril Mayne
1960–1973 Lionel du Toit
1973–1987 John Churchill
1988–1998 Henry Stapleton
1999–2003 Graeme Knowles
2004–2022 Mark Boyling (retired 30 September 2022)

References

Fasti Ecclesiae Anglicanae 1541-1857: volume 11: Carlisle, Chester, Durham, Manchester, Ripon, and Sodor and Man dioceses

Church of England deans
Lists of English people
Diocese of Carlisle